Austroassiminea letha is a species of minute salt marsh snails with an operculum, aquatic gastropod mollusks, or micromollusks in the family Assimineidae. This species is endemic to Australia.

References

Gastropods of Australia
Assimineidae
Vulnerable fauna of Australia
Gastropods described in 1982
Taxonomy articles created by Polbot